Mannar Fort (Mannaram Balakotuwa) is located on Mannar Island, Sri Lanka. It was built by Portuguese in 1560. The fort fell to the Dutch in 1658, and they rebuilt the fort in 1696. In 1795 the British occupied the fort following the surrender by the Dutch.

It is a square-shaped fort with four bastions and is located next to the new bridge that connects the mainland with the Mannar Island.

The fort is currently occupied by the Department of Archeology.

References 

 

British forts in Sri Lanka
Dutch forts in Sri Lanka
Forts in Northern Province, Sri Lanka
Portuguese forts in Sri Lanka
Archaeological protected monuments in Mannar District